Nodozana is a genus of moths in the subfamily Arctiinae erected by Herbert Druce in 1899.

Species
 Nodozana albula Dyar, 1914
 Nodozana bellicula Schaus, 1905
 Nodozana bifasciata Rothschild, 1913
 Nodozana boliviana Rothschild, 1913
 Nodozana boudinoti Gibeaux, 1983
 Nodozana catocaloides Gibeaux, 1983
 Nodozana cocciniceps Dognin, 1912
 Nodozana endoxantha E. D. Jones, 1908
 Nodozana fifina Dognin, 1913
 Nodozana fifi Dognin, 1891
 Nodozana heieroglyphica Rothschild, 1913
 Nodozana jucunda E. D. Jones, 1914
 Nodozana picturata Schaus, 1911
 Nodozana pyrophora Hampson, 1911
 Nodozana rhodosticta Butler, 1878
 Nodozana roseofuliginosa Rothschild, 1913
 Nodozana subandroconiata Rothschild, 1916
 Nodozana thricophora H. Druce, 1885
 Nodozana toulgoeti Gibeaux, 1983
 Nodozana xanthomela H. Druce, 1899

Former species
 Nodozana angustata Gibeaux, 1983
 Nodozana aurobrunnea Gibeaux, 1983
 Nodozana granvillei Gibeaux, 1983
 Nodozana griseovariegata Gibeaux, 1983

References

External links

Lithosiini
Moth genera